Donda is a genus of moths from the family Erebidae. The genus was discovered by Frederic Moore in 1882.

Species
Donda continentalis Behounek, Han & Kononenko, 2012 Thailand, Vietnam, SW.China
Donda eurychlora (Walker, 1858) India
Donda hunana Han, Behounek & Kononenko, 2020
Donda lichenoides (Hampson, 1894) Nagas
Donda ornata Moore, 1883 Bengal
Donda sailendra Kobes, 1982 Sumatra, Borneo
Donda sundana Behounek, Han & Kononenko, 2012

References

Calpinae